Bondara is a town in the south of Dikhil Region. It is situated about 11 kilometres (6 miles) south of Dikhil and 2 km north of the border with Ethiopia.

Overview
The town lies near the border with Ethiopia. Nearby towns and villages include Dikhil (10 km), Sankal (15 km) and As Eyla (26 km).

Demographics
The town inhabitants belong to various mainly Afro-Asiatic-speaking ethnic groups, with the Issa Somali predominant.

Climate
Bondara is located at an altitude of 470 meters above sea level in low-shrouded mountains and hills and the surrounding mountains.

References
Bôndara, Djibouti

Populated places in Djibouti